KUCC 88.1 FM is a radio station licensed to Clarkston, Washington.  The station broadcasts a Christian format and is owned by Upper Columbia Media Foundation.

References

External links

UCC